The Cricket Mountains are a  long mountain range located in central-south Millard County, Utah, United States, on the east border of Sevier Lake, in the Great Basin Desert.

The southwestern Cricket Mountains merge southwest into the smaller San Francisco Mountains on the southern border of Sevier Lake and on the east of Wah Wah Valley.

Description
The Cricket Mountains rise to peaks ranging from the  elevation to its highpoint of Headlight Mountain, in the extreme southwest of the range. The Cricket Mountains are bordered by the Sevier Desert on the east, north, and west, where the Sevier River flows west then southwest into Sevier Lake, on the range's west border.

The southwest of the range merges into the northeast of the San Francisco Mountains, a slightly smaller range. Both ranges trend southwesterly x northeast, presumably part of Basin and Range block faulting.

Graymont Lime
It is one of the 10 largest lime plants in the United States. It was previously owned by Continental Lime, which was purchased by Graymont Lime.

See also

 List of mountain ranges of Utah

References

External links

 Headlight Mountain, mountainzone (coordinates)
 
 Cricket Mountain Plant at Graymont Lime

Mountain ranges of Millard County, Utah
Mountain ranges of the Great Basin
Mountain ranges of Utah